Citrus Hills is a census-designated place (CDP) in Citrus County, Florida, United States. The population was 7,470 at the 2010 census, up from 4,029 in 2000.

The CDP takes its name from The Villages of Citrus Hills, a master-planned community first developed by Gerald Nash and Sam Tamposi in the 1970s.  (Although sharing a similar name with The Villages, the well-known giant Central Florida retirement community, the two developments are not related.)

Geography
Citrus Hills is located northeast of the center of Citrus County at  (28.886087, -82.423450). It is bordered by Pine Ridge to the north, Hernando to the northeast, Inverness Highlands North to the east, and Lecanto to the south and west.

Demographics

As of the census of 2000, there were 4,029 people, 1,783 households, and 1,485 families residing in the CDP. The racial makeup of the CDP was 92.78% White, 1.44% African American, 0.32% Native American, 4.02% Asian, 0.45% from other races, and 0.99% from two or more races. Hispanic or Latino of any race were 2.83% of the population.

There were 1,783 households, out of which 15.1% had children under the age of 18 living with them, 78.4% were married couples living together, 3.4% had a female householder with no husband present, and 16.7% were non-families. 13.7% of all households were made up of individuals, and 8.0% had someone living alone who was 65 years of age or older.  The average household size was 2.26 and the average family size was 2.46.

In the CDP, the population was spread out, with 13.3% under the age of 18, 2.2% from 18 to 24, 13.3% from 25 to 44, 36.6% from 45 to 64, and 34.6% who were 65 years of age or older.  The median age was 59 years. For every 100 females, there were 96.1 males.  For every 100 females age 18 and over, there were 94.5 males.

The median income for a household in the CDP was $48,229, and the median income for a family was $53,222. Males had a median income of $35,125 versus $24,875 for females. The per capita income for the CDP was $25,753.  About 4.3% of families and 6.5% of the population were below the poverty line, including 16.2% of those under age 18 and 1.4% of those age 65 or over.

Education
The CDP is served by Citrus County Schools. Elementary schools serving sections of the CDP include Central Ridge, Forest Ridge, and Hernando. Middle schools serving sections of the CDP include Citrus Springs,  Inverness, and Lecanto. High schools serving sections of the CDP include Citrus High School and Lecanto High School.

References

External links
 Citrus Hills homebuilders website
 Citrus County Visitors & Convention Bureau

Census-designated places in Citrus County, Florida
Census-designated places in Florida
1970s establishments in Florida
Populated places established in the 1970s